Street Sounds Electro 3 is the third compilation album in a series and was released 1984 on the StreetSounds label. The album was released on LP and cassette and contains seven electro music and old school hip hop tracks mixed by Herbie Laidley.

Track listing

References

External links
 Street Sounds Electro 3 at Discogs

1984 compilation albums
Hip hop compilation albums
Electro compilation albums